The men's 400 metres hurdles event at the 2010 World Junior Championships in Athletics was held in Moncton, New Brunswick, Canada, at Moncton Stadium on 21, 22 and 23 July.

Medalists

Results

Final
23 July

Semifinals
22 July

Semifinal 1

Semifinal 2

Semifinal 3

Heats
21 July

Heat 1

Heat 2

Heat 3

Heat 4

Heat 5

Heat 6

Heat 7

Participation
According to an unofficial count, 49 athletes from 38 countries participated in the event.

References

400 metres hurdles
400 metres hurdles at the World Athletics U20 Championships